The 2018 Tevlin Women's Challenger was a professional tennis tournament played on indoor hard courts. It was the fourteenth edition of the tournament and was part of the 2018 ITF Women's Circuit. It took place in Toronto, Canada, on 29 October–4 November 2018.

Singles main draw entrants

Seeds 

 1 Rankings as of 22 October 2018.

Other entrants 
The following players received a wildcard into the singles main draw:
  Ariana Arseneault
  Carson Branstine
  Louise Kwong
  Catherine Leduc

The following player received entry using a protected ranking:
  Quirine Lemoine

The following player received entry as a special exempt:
  Daria Lopatetska

The following players received entry from the qualifying draw:
  Andreea Ghițescu
  Nadja Gilchrist
  Kennedy Shaffer
  Natalia Siedliska

The following players received entry as lucky losers:
  Alexandra Damaschin
  Tori Kinard
  Pamela Montez

Champions

Singles

 Quirine Lemoine def.  Kateryna Kozlova, 6–2, 6–3

Doubles

 Sharon Fichman /  Maria Sanchez def.  Maja Chwalińska /  Elitsa Kostova, 6–0, 6–4

External links 
 2018 Tevlin Women's Challenger at ITFtennis.com
 Official website

2018 ITF Women's Circuit
Ten
2018 in Canadian tennis
Tevlin Women's Challenger